Maldonado may refer to:

Maldonado (surname)
Maldonado Department of Uruguay
Maldonado, Uruguay, the capital city of Maldonado Department
Pedro Vicente Maldonado (canton), Ecuador
Maldonado Base, Ecuadorian research base in Antarctica
Puerto Maldonado, a city in Peru
Maldonado Stream, a stream in Buenos Aires, Argentina

See also
 Maldonada (disambiguation)